Novomikhaylovka is a rural locality (a settlement) in Barnaul, Altai Krai, Russia. The population was 1,304 as of 2013. There are 21 streets.

Geography 
Novomikhaylovka is located 22 km west of Barnaul by road. Aviator is the nearest rural locality.

References 

Rural localities in Barnaul urban okrug